Atefeh Razavi (born March 6, 1969) is an Iranian actress and make-up artist.

Filmography

Actress 
Film
An Soo-ye Atash (Across the Fire), 1986
 Zir-e Bamha-ye Shahr, 1989
 Nargess, 1992
 Yek Mard, Yek Khers (A Man, A Bear), 1993
 Zinat, 1993
 Chehreh, 1995
 Nejat Yaftegan (The Rescued), 1995
 Banoo-ye Ordibehesht (The May Lady), 1997
 Tales of Kish (The Greek Ship episode), 1999
 Dance of Death, 2000
 Gahi Be Aseman Negah Kon, 2002
 Angel Street Bride, 2021

Home Video

References

 Her profile at IranActor.com

External links

 

1969 births
Living people
People from Tehran
Actresses from Tehran
Iranian film actresses
Iranian stage actresses
Iranian make-up artists
Iranian television actresses